Baron Heinrich von Berenberg-Gossler (1907–1997) was a German banker, a member of the illustrious Berenberg-Gossler banking dynasty, and owner and head of Berenberg Bank.

He was the son of Baron Cornelius von Berenberg-Gossler and Nadia, née Oesterreich (1887–1962), and the nephew of Senator and Ambassador John von Berenberg-Gossler.

In the 1930s, he worked for the Bank of London and South America in Buenos Aires. He became a partner of Berenberg Bank in 1935 and later Chairman. He was also consul general of Monaco.

Literature
Genealogisches Handbuch des Adels, Band 16, Freiherrliche Häuser B II, C. A. Starke Verlag, Limburg (Lahn) 1957

References

German bankers
Heinrich
Berenberg Bank people
Grand burghers of Hamburg
Prussian nobility
1907 births
1997 deaths